Paul F. Lutty (June 30, 1917 – October 3, 1988) was a Democratic member of the Pennsylvania House of Representatives.

References

Democratic Party members of the Pennsylvania House of Representatives
1988 deaths
1917 births
20th-century American politicians